Charles William Schultz (October 8, 1915 – March 15, 1989) was an American football offensive tackle in the National Football League who played for the Green Bay Packers.  Schultz played collegiate ball for the University of Minnesota before being drafted by the Packers in the 20th round of the 1939 NFL Draft.  He played professionally for 3 seasons from 1939 to 1941.

References

External links

1915 births
1989 deaths
Players of American football from Saint Paul, Minnesota
American football offensive tackles
Minnesota Golden Gophers football players
Green Bay Packers players